Escape from Atlantis is a 1997 made-for-TV movie, starring Jeff Speakman. The movie originally aired on Starz was written by Arne Olsen and directed by Strathford Hamilton.

Plot
A family falls into a time warp where they get into Atlantis, a place full of strange and magic creatures.

Cast
 Jeff Speakman as Matt Spencer
 Tim Thomerson as Liam Gallagher
 Justin Burnette as Adam Spencer
 Mercedes McNab as Claudia Spencer
 Breck Wilson as Chris Spencer

Reception
At-a-Glance Film Reviews gave the film a very bad review, stating: "I find myself at a loss for a compliment to pay this movie. If I had to muster one, I'd say that the photography of the island is often (but not always) quite beautiful. It's a nice thing to boast about, but as the movie's sole asset, it stinks."

References

External links
 
 

1997 television films
1997 films
American television films
Films directed by Strathford Hamilton